Many places in Hong Kong got their names from rivers.  With urban development, many of these rivers are converted into sewers, as it is difficult to stop them flowing downhill.

List of subterranean rivers

Kwai Chung
Kai Tak Nullah (partly)
Sai Wan Ho
Tai Hang
Tsak Yue Chung (lower course)
Tsui Ping Nullah (middle course)
Wong Nai Chung

See also

Subterranean river
Subterranean rivers of London

Subterranean Hong Kong
Rivers of Hong Kong
Subterranean rivers